The 2003 Grand Prix de Trois-Rivières was the fourth race of the 2003 American Le Mans Series season.  It took place at Circuit Trois-Rivières in Trois-Rivières, Quebec on August 3, 2003.

Official results
Class winners in bold.  Cars failing to complete 75% of winner's distance marked as Not Classified (NC).

Statistics
 Pole Position - #1 Infineon Team Joest - 0:57.740
 Fastest Lap - #1 Infineon Team Joest - 0:59.265
 Distance - 413.680 km
 Average Speed - 137.808 km/h

External links
  
 Race Results

T
Grand Prix de Trois-Rivieres
Sport in Trois-Rivières